Ozdín is a village and municipality in the Poltár District in the Banská Bystrica Region of Slovakia.

References

External links
 
 
Touristic blog about Ozdín
Ozdín satellite map

Villages and municipalities in Poltár District